Wendel Geraldo Maurício e Silva, commonly known as Wendel, (born 8 April 1982) is a Brazilian former professional footballer who played as a midfielder.

Club career
Wendel started his career with Cruzeiro Esporte Clube in 1998 with the youth team. By 2000 he began featuring in some matches for the senior side. In 2005, he was loaned out to Santos on an 18-month deal. After a successful spell there, Wendel secured a move to Bordeaux from Cruzeiro in August 2006.

Bordeaux
Soon after he signed for Bordeaux, he broke into the first team and by the end of his first season he had played a total of 29 league games with five goals. He was much more active in his second season, scoring 12 league goals to go along with seven assists in 36 league games. The 2008–09 started brightly for Wendel as he started every game. In the season opener against Caen he had a free-kick on target in the early minutes, had an open shot on target and then set up Yoann Gourcuff to score from outside the area. Then against Nantes he set up a goal. After four games he finally opened his account by scoring against Nice, following this up by scoring again three days later against Le Havre in a 2–2 draw. Bordeaux went on to win Ligue 1, the club's first title triumph since 1999  and added the Coupe de la Ligue trophy in 2009 under the management of Laurent Blanc. In the Coupe de la Ligue Final, Wendel opened the scoring in the third minute against Ligue 2 side Vannes OC in an eventual 4–0 triumph for his side. Wendel appeared in 29 games that season, starting 25 of them, and added four goals and nine assists. The 2009–10 campaign for Bordeaux would prove to be less successful, as they could not retain their league or league cup trophies. However, Wendel was very productive in the league from his wide position, scoring 11 goals and adding six assists. The following season proved even more difficult after the departures of Marouane Chamakh and Gourcuff. Wendel's last appearance for the club came on 29 May 2011, in the final match of the 2010–11 Ligue 1 season. He capped his final performance with a goal in a 2–0 victory over Montpellier HSC which ensured that Bordeaux finished the season in 7th place.

Al-Ittihad
After five seasons in the southwest of France, Wendel moved on in August 2011. During his time with Les Girondins he scored 35 goals in 156 Ligue 1 appearances, scoring hat tricks against Toulouse FC and PSG. After his departure, he signed for Saudi Arabian side Al-Ittihad.

International career
Wendel was first capped for Brazil at the 2004 CONMEBOL Men Pre-Olympic Tournament. Wendel received French nationality in 2011 and it was reported that he desired to play for France,. However, in fact, he is ineligible to play for a national team other than his native Brazil because he only held Brazilian nationality when he represented Brazil.

Career statistics
Correct as of 7 March 2010

Honours
Cruzeiro
Brazil Cup: 2000, 2003
South-Minas Cup: 2001, 2002
Campeonato Mineiro: 2003, 2004
Campeonato Brasileiro Série A: 2003

Santos
Campeonato Paulista: 2006

Bordeaux
Ligue 1: 2008–09
Coupe de la Ligue: 2007, 2009
Trophée des Champions: 2008, 2009

Al-Shabab
Saudi Professional League: 2011-12

Sport Recife
Copa do Nordeste: 2014
Campeonato Pernambucano: 2014

Goiás
Campeonato Goiano: 2016

References

External links
 
 
 Portuguese Liga stats at LPFP.pt 
 Brazilian League stats. at Futpedia 
 

1982 births
Living people
Brazilian footballers
Association football midfielders
Campeonato Brasileiro Série A players
Primeira Liga players
Ligue 1 players
Saudi Professional League players
Cruzeiro Esporte Clube players
C.D. Nacional players
Santos FC players
FC Girondins de Bordeaux players
Ittihad FC players
Al-Shabab FC (Riyadh) players
CR Vasco da Gama players
Sport Club do Recife players
Brazilian expatriate footballers
Brazilian expatriate sportspeople in France
Expatriate footballers in France
Brazilian expatriate sportspeople in Portugal
Expatriate footballers in Portugal
Brazilian expatriate sportspeople in Saudi Arabia
Expatriate footballers in Saudi Arabia